Frances Elizabeth Bavier (December 14, 1902 – December 6, 1989) was an American stage and television actress. Originally from New York theatre, she worked in film and television from the 1950s until the 1970s. She is best known for her role of Aunt Bee on The Andy Griffith Show and Mayberry R.F.D. from 1960 to 1970. Aunt Bee logged more Mayberry years (ten) than any other character. She won an Emmy Award for Outstanding Supporting Comedy Actress for the role in 1967. Bavier was additionally known for playing Amy Morgan on It's a Great Life (1954–1956).

Early life and career
Bavier was born in New York City in a brownstone on Gramercy Park to Charles S. Bavier, a stationary engineer, and Mary S. (née Birmingham) Bavier.  She originally planned to become a teacher after attending Columbia University. She first appeared in vaudeville, later moving to the Broadway stage.

After graduating from the American Academy of Dramatic Arts in 1925, she was cast in the stage comedy The Poor Nut. Bavier's big break came in the original Broadway production of On Borrowed Time. She later appeared with Henry Fonda in the play Point of No Return.

Bavier had roles in more than a dozen films, as well as playing a range of supporting roles on television. Career highlights include her turn as Mrs. Barley in the classic 1951 film The Day the Earth Stood Still. In 1955, she played the rough and tough "Aunt Maggie" Sawtelle, a frontier Ma Barker-type character, in the Lone Ranger episode "Sawtelle's Saga End". In 1957, she played Nora Martin, mother of Eve Arden's character on The Eve Arden Show, despite the fact that Arden was less than six years younger than Bavier. That same year, Bavier guest-starred in the eighth episode of Perry Mason as Louise Marlow in "The Case of the Crimson Kiss".

She was in an episode of Make Room for Daddy, which featured Andy Griffith as Andy Taylor and Ron Howard as Opie Taylor. She played a character named Henrietta Perkins. The episode led to The Andy Griffith Show, and Bavier was cast in the role of Aunt Bee. Bavier had a love-hate relationship with her famous role during the run of the show. As a New York City actress, she felt her dramatic talents were being overlooked, yet after playing Bee for eight seasons, she was the only original cast member to remain with the series in the spin-off, Mayberry R.F.D., for two additional seasons.

Bavier was easily offended on the set of The Andy Griffith Show and the production staff took a cautious approach when communicating with her. Series star Andy Griffith once admitted the two sometimes clashed during the series run. On an appearance on Larry King Live (November 27, 2003), Griffith said Bavier phoned him four months before she died and apologized for being "difficult" during the series run. Bavier confessed in an interview with Bill Ballard for Carolina Camera that "it is very difficult for an actress ... to create a role and to be so identified that you as a person no longer exist and all the recognition you get is for a part that is created on the screen."

Bavier won the Primetime Emmy Award for Outstanding Performance by an Actress in a Supporting Role in a Comedy in 1967.

Later years
In 1972, Bavier retired from acting and bought a home in Siler City, North Carolina. On choosing to live in North Carolina instead of her native New York, Bavier said, "I fell in love with North Carolina, all the pretty roads and the trees." Bavier was said to have married Russell Carpenter briefly in her early career, but there is no proof of this having actually occurred. According to a 1981 article by Chip Womick, a staff writer of The Courier Tribune, Bavier enthusiastically promoted Christmas and Easter Seal Societies from her Siler City home, and often wrote inspirational letters to fans who sought autographs. Additionally she left a $100,000 trust fund for the police force in Siler City, North Carolina whose interest is divided between the approximately 20 employees as a bonus every December.

Death

Bavier was described "as living a sparse life in her later years, a very quiet life". On November 22, 1989, she was admitted to Chatham Hospital, where she was kept in the coronary care unit for two weeks. She was discharged on December 4, 1989, ten days before her 87th birthday. Bavier died at 7pm on December 6, 1989, two days after being released from the hospital. The immediate causes of death were listed as congestive heart failure, myocardial infarction, coronary artery disease, and atherosclerosis, with supporting factors being breast cancer, arthritis, and COPD.
Bavier is interred at Oakwood Cemetery in Siler City. Her headstone includes the name of her most famous role, "Aunt Bee", and reads, "To live in the hearts of those left behind is not to die."

Filmography

Television credits

References

External links

Frances Bavier Papers, 1930s-1990

1902 births
1989 deaths
Actresses from New York City
20th-century American actresses
American Academy of Dramatic Arts alumni
American film actresses
American stage actresses
American television actresses
Columbia University alumni
Outstanding Performance by a Supporting Actress in a Comedy Series Primetime Emmy Award winners
People from Siler City, North Carolina
Vaudeville performers
People from Gramercy Park
Deaths from coronary artery disease